Changle County is under the administration of Weifang, in Shandong Province.  The ancient Kingdom of Beihai was located to the west of present-day Changle County.

Administrative divisions
As 2017, this county is divided to 5 subdistricts and 4 towns.
Subdistricts

Towns

Climate

References

 

Counties of Shandong
Weifang